In the politics of Seattle, Washington in the United States, "Gang of Four" (also, sometimes "The Four Amigos") refers to Bernie Whitebear, Bob Santos, Roberto Maestas, and Larry Gossett, who founded Seattle's Minority Executive Directors's Coalition.

All four were associated with radical minority rights activism in the late 1960s and early 1970s, and all went on to leadership roles. Whitebear founded the Seattle Indian Health Board and the United Indians of All Tribes Foundation. Santos was a prominent leader among Seattle's Asian Americans, director of the Asian Coalition, and executive director of the Inter*Im in the International District;  Maestas was the founder and director of El Centro de la Raza. While studying at the University of Washington, Gossett founded a Black Student Union.  He later created Central Area Motivation Program and went on to public office as a member of the King County Council.

Notes

American community activists
Minority rights activists
Activists from Seattle